Sigbrit Villoms (also spelled Villums), (possible date of death 1532), was a Danish-Norwegian politician from Amsterdam, mother to the mistress of King Christian II of Denmark, Dyveke Sigbritsdatter, and advisor and de facto minister of finance for the king between 1519 and 1523.

Biography 
Sigbrit Willoms was born into a merchant family from Amsterdam.  One of her two brothers, Dionysius Villoms, is known to have been an apothecary.  She is known to have been educated in counting, reading and writing in the language Low German, and she is known to have been tutored in contemporary herbal medicine.    

She belonged to one of the Dutch merchant families, that at this point in time entered into competition with the Germans, who had long dominated the trade in the Nordic countries.  At an unknown date, she moved to Bergen, Norway, where she is known to have lived in 1507, in the company of her brothers. 

She is known to have had a son, Reynold Sigbritssøn, who is otherwise not mentioned.  As none of her children are called illegitimate, Sigbrit Willoms must have been married, but her husband's name is not mentioned anywhere, nor is it known when he died: he may have been named Nicolaas, and was most certainly dead by 1507. It is known that she did not use her husband's name, as she used the patronymic Willoms or Villoms(datter).  

She was the mother of Dyveke Sigbritsdatter, who met the future Danish King Christian II in Bergen in 1507.  In this year, the close confidant of Crown Prince Christian, Erik Valkendorf, met them both at a stand in the market where they sold pastries. The business of Sigbrit Willoms is not more closely mentioned, but it is noted that she still had a business company in Bergen in 1519. In 1507, she is known to have kept an inn in Bergen, and to have sold pastries and vine on the market and in the harbor. Valkendorf told the prince about Dyveke's beauty, and the prince invited mother and daughter to a ball, after which Dyveke, with the consent of Sigbrit, became the lover of Christian.

Life in Denmark
In 1513, when Christian became king of Denmark, mother and daughter moved with the king to Copenhagen. Her brother, Dionysius Villoms, was named apothecary of the king, her other brother having been appointed to the office of lensmand at Bergenhus the year prior. 

Her influence over the king became greater after the death of her daughter in 1517, and she was made his political adviser and confidant.  From 1519 onward, she was accounted the most politically influential person in Denmark after the king himself.  

In 1517, Sigbrit was appointed to succeed her former antagonist Anne Meinstrup to the office of Hofmesterinde to the Queen's Household, as well as put in charge of the Household of the Crown Prince Hans as royal governess. 

The king put her in charge of the custom office and the royal treasury, in effect making her the de facto royal treasurer and Minister of Finance: she was however never formally called minister, but instead given the title of Mother Sigbrit, at that time normally an honorary title for the female head of a family.  

Being a bourgeoise, she was known for forwarding the interests of the merchant classes and the interests of the cities in general.  In 1522, she instigated a new law about hygiene in the capital city of Copenhagen, where people were told to have their houses cleaned every week. 

She was unpopular with the nobility, and the target of public slander: because of her herbal knowledge, her critics spread rumors that she was a witch, and she was blamed for being the person behind the Stockholm Bloodbath in 1520.

Later life and death
When King Christian was driven out of Denmark in 1523, Sigbrit followed him to the Netherlands, where Christian asked for aid from his brother-in-law, the emperor. The emperor made the condition that Christian was to get rid of Sigbrit, which Christian agreed to.

The date and circumstances of her death are unconfirmed. In 1532, a woman was detained in a prison in the Netherlands, who is believed to have been Sigbrit. The emperor wished to have this prisoner executed for witchcraft. It is not known if she was.

See also 
 Anna Pehrsönernas moder, a contemporary woman with a similar position in Sweden.

References 

 Dansk kvindebiografisk leksikon
 Umar Sayyed, Willemsdr., Sybrich, in: Digitaal Vrouwenlexicon van Nederland. URL: http://resources.huygens.knaw.nl/vrouwenlexicon/lemmata/data/Willemsdr.,%20Sybrich [13/01/2014] 

Court of Christian II of Denmark
15th-century births
1530s deaths
16th-century Dutch businesswomen
16th-century Dutch businesspeople
16th-century Norwegian women
Government ministers of Denmark
16th-century Danish politicians
Danish courtiers
16th-century Danish businesswomen
16th-century Danish businesspeople
Stockholm Bloodbath